Thomas Kokoro Frost (born 14 September 2002) is a Samoan New Zealander swimmer who has represented Samoa at the Commonwealth Games and Pacific Games.  He holds multiple age group and open Samoan records for swimming.

Frost hails from the villages of Manase and Fasito’outa. He was educated at Palmerston North Boys' High School and Kapiti College.  He currently attends Victoria University of Wellington where he studies Intercultural Communications. He began swimming in 2008. He trains and competes for the Ōtaki Titans Swimming Club based on the Kāpiti Coast and is coached by his mother, Seuga Frost and Olympian Jonathan Winter. 

He competed at the 2019 Pacific Games in Apia, where he made the finals in the 50m backstroke.

On 14 July 2022 he was selected as part of Samoa's team for the 2022 Commonwealth Games in Birmingham. He competed in the 50m and 100m Butterfly, 50m and 100m backstroke, and both the mixed 4x100m Medley and Freestyle relays.

References 

2002 births
Living people
Samoan male swimmers
New Zealand male swimmers
Commonwealth Games competitors for Samoa